Locust Creek Covered Bridge can refer to:

 Locust Creek Covered Bridge (West Virginia) in Pocahontas County, West Virginia
 Locust Creek Covered Bridge (Missouri) in Linn County, Missouri